Choi Young-eun (born 26 September 1995) is a South Korean football goalkeeper, who plays for Daegu FC in the K League 1.

Club career
Born on 26 September 1995,  Choi played his youth football for Sungkyunkwan University, and was the starting  goalkeeper in its Korean FA Cup match against Seongnam FC in June 2016. He transferred to Daegu FC in January 2018, and made his debut for the club on 29 July 2018, playing against Jeonbuk Motors.

Club career statistics

Honors and awards

Player
Daegu FC
 Korean FA Cup Winners (1) : 2018

Notes

1995 births
Living people
Association football goalkeepers
South Korean footballers
Daegu FC players
K League 1 players